Maria-Hélène Schneider (27 March 1952 – 3 February 2011), known professionally as Maria Schneider, was a French actress. In 1972, at the age of 19, she starred opposite Marlon Brando in Last Tango in Paris, but being traumatised by a rape scene and hounded by unsavoury publicity negatively affected her subsequent career.  Although Michelangelo Antonioni's The Passenger (1975) showcased her abilities, a reputation for walking out of films mid-production resulted in her becoming unwelcome in the industry. However, she re-established stability in her personal and professional life in the early 1980s, and became an advocate for equality and improving the conditions actresses worked under. She continued acting in film and TV until a few years before she died in 2011 after a long illness.

Early life and family 
Schneider was born in Paris to Daniel Gélin, a French actor, and Marie-Christine Schneider from Romania, a model who ran a bookshop in Paris. Gélin was married to actress and producer Danièle Delorme during the affair and his lack of father-level involvement was deeply felt by his daughter. Gélin never recognised Schneider as his daughter, though he publicly acknowledged his paternity in the 1970s. Schneider was first brought up by her mother in a town near the French border with Germany. Eventually, her mother was unwilling to attend to her and entrusted her to a nurse for two years. Maria Schneider later lived for several years with her maternal uncle Michel Schneider and his wife. She reconnected with her biological father when she was sixteen, by visiting him unannounced.

Schneider later said that she had met Gélin only "three times". Her cousin Vanessa Schneider wrote, in a biographical book published in 2018, that Maria Schneider had actually been in regular contact with her father during her late teens. It was he who first brought her to a film set. Over the years, Maria Schneider and her biological father met irregularly. She eventually bonded with her half-siblings (who had been unaware of her until after she starred in Last Tango in Paris), especially her half-sister Fiona Gélin. Her half-brother Xavier Gélin was also an actor.

Acting career

Early years 
As a teenager, Schneider loved films, going to the cinema up to four times a week. She left home at age 15 after an argument with her mother and went to Paris, where she made her stage-acting debut that same year. She eked out a living as a film extra and a model. While working on a film set, she met Brigitte Bardot, who having worked with her father on several productions (a father who refused to help his daughter), was "horrified" that the young actress was homeless and offered her a room in her house. Through Bardot, Schneider met people in the film business, including Warren Beatty, who was greatly impressed by Schneider, and introduced her to the William Morris Agency. She was 18 when she had her first break in 1970, appearing in Madly, starring Alain Delon. This was followed by relatively substantial roles in films such as Roger Vadim's Hellé (1972); The Old Maid (La Vieille Fille) (1972) with Philippe Noiret; Dear Parents (Cari genitori) (1973) opposite Florinda Bolkan and Catherine Spaak; and Dance of Love (1973), based on a play by Arthur Schnitzler. (The latter film is also known as Merry-Go-Round, which is distinct from Schneider's 1981 film of the same name directed by Jacques Rivette.)

Last Tango in Paris and related controversies 
Schneider gained international renown for her performance at the age of 19 in the sexually explicit Last Tango in Paris (1972), directed by Bernardo Bertolucci. In a graphic portrayal of anonymous sex with an older man, she performed several nude scenes, including a rape scene that Bertolucci did not reveal to her until just before the filming of it. In 2007, she said:
 In 2013, Bertolucci said he had withheld the information from her to generate a real "reaction of frustration and rage". Brando alleged that Bertolucci had wanted the characters to have real sex, but Brando and Schneider both said it was simulated. Actress Jessica Tovey, writing in The Guardian, argued that Bertolucci's defense of pursuing an artistic vision was "bogus" and that what occurred was "a violation."  Tovey also observed that it is difficult to imagine the "roles being reversed; Brando being brutalized only to discover midway through filming that Schneider and Bertolucci had conspired to add an element of humiliation."

In 2001, Schneider commented:

Criminal proceedings were brought against Bertolucci in Italy for the rape scene; the film was sequestered by the censorship commission and all copies were ordered destroyed. An Italian court revoked Bertolucci's civil rights for five years and gave him a four-month suspended prison sentence. In 1978 the Appeals Court of Bologna ordered three copies of the film to be preserved in the national film library with the stipulation that they could not be viewed, until Bertolucci was later able to re-submit it for general distribution with no cuts.

Schneider said that due to her experience with the film – and her treatment afterward as a sex symbol rather than as a serious actress – she decided never to work nude again. She started struggling with depression, became a drug addict and made several suicide attempts.

She later became a women's rights advocate, in particular fighting for more female film directors, more respect for female actors, and better representation of women in film and media.

1970s, post-Last Tango 

In 1975, Schneider was cast opposite Jack Nicholson in the well-received Michelangelo Antonioni film The Passenger, which remains one of the highlights of her career, and was the personal favorite of the actress. That same year, Schneider also starred in René Clément's final movie, the Hitchcockian thriller Wanted: Babysitter, in which, according to Schneider, the director actually wanted the actress for the villainous role; yet, when Antonioni screened The Passenger for him, Clément decided that Schneider would be ideal for the heroine. The picture, produced by Carlo Ponti (as with The Passenger and Dear Parents) and also featuring Robert Vaughn, Vic Morrow, and Sydne Rome, went largely unnoticed by the public and critics alike.

During the '70s, Schneider traveled (including to the Hopi Reservation and Navajo Nation) and lived in various parts of Europe, including Venice, Paris, and London. After The Passenger and Wanted: Babysitter, Schneider settled in Los Angeles for a year, looking around for film opportunities and being offered roles in Hollywood movies such as Black Sunday (1977) as a Palestinian guerilla terrorist, which she turned down based on what she perceived to be poor quality material. She signed up with renowned talent agent and producer Paul Kohner, and several movies were considered, but ultimately little came of this. Work became difficult for her to find, as she had become uninsurable.

Moving back to Europe, Schneider was asked by director Tinto Brass to play Drusilla, the incestuous sister of a notorious Roman emperor, opposite A Clockwork Orange star Malcolm McDowell, in the infamous, pornographic, multi-million dollar Penthouse production of Caligula; Schneider refused to perform nude or do graphic sex scenes, and was replaced mid-production with Teresa Ann Savoy, who had appeared in the director's previous film Salon Kitty.

Around the same time, Schneider agreed to star in Luis Buñuel's That Obscure Object of Desire (1977), and showed up on set, yet argued with the filmmaker over how her role would be portrayed in light of Schneider's growing concern regarding the depiction of women in cinema , and because of excessive nudity. Schneider ultimately dropped out, and Buñuel made the creative, unusual decision to replace her with not one but two actresses for the same role: Carole Bouquet and Ángela Molina. Schneider was also asked by Bertolucci to appear in his 1976 film 1900, but either turned him down or was fired. She was asked to play Mary, mother of Jesus in Franco Zeffirelli's 1979 television miniseries Jesus of Nazareth; Schneider said she did not feel right for the part, though later regretted missing out on this opportunity, and instead eventually appeared in Zeffirelli's 1996 film Jane Eyre in a brief appearance as Bertha Mason.

For the rest of the 1970s, Schneider opted to star in small-budgeted, independent European productions, such as the little-seen Swiss period piece Violanta (1976, with a young Gérard Depardieu), and three consciously feministic works: the Italian production I Belong to Me (Io Sono Mia) (1978, with Stefania Sandrelli); the graphic, disturbing Memoirs of a French Whore (French title: La Dérobade) (1978, alongside Miou-Miou, and for which Schneider was nominated for Best Supporting Actress at the 1980 5th César Awards); and the lesbian Dutch drama A Woman Like Eve, directed by Nouchka van Brakel, where Schneider plays the bohemian love interest of conflicted Monique van de Ven who is married to and has children with Peter Faber.

Towards the end of the decade, famed arthouse director Jacques Rivette met Schneider at a cafe on the Champs-Elysées and asked her what kind of movie she'd like to make with him, to which Schneider replied "a thriller"; Rivette then asked which actor she'd like to star opposite, and she suggested her friend Joe Dallesandro, renowned for his association with Andy Warhol and leading performances in Paul Morrissey's films. The result was the vague, symbolic crime drama Merry-Go-Round, a troubled production that Schneider and Rivette, both overcome by ill health and personal issues, eventually completed, and was finally released in 1981 to mediocre reviews.

The 1980s 
The 1980s were a much quieter period for Schneider, both personally and professionally. Following issues with multiple drug addictions (including cocaine, LSD, and heroin) and a suicide attempt in the '70s (in the looming shadow of Last Tango in Paris, which friend and one-time girlfriend of Marlon Brando, Esther Anderson, said "ruined [Maria's] life"), Schneider once and for all overcame these problems by the early '80s - which she accredited to her "angel", which may have been life-partner Maria Pia Almadio (or, according to some sources, Crapanzano). The beginning of the decade saw the actress appearing in a campy Belgian vampire comedy with Louise Fletcher, Mama Dracula (1980), which received universally negative reviews from critics. The same year, she performed alongside Klaus Kinski in the French thriller Hate (Haine).

1981 saw Schneider in Peacetime in Paris, a Yugoslavian picture set in the French capital, which follows a documentarian researching the history of Nazism in Paris; there he meets and falls in love with Schneider's mysterious character, who helps him out on his quest. The picture won a Special Prize at the 12th Moscow International Film Festival, and also featured Schneider's father, Daniel Gélin, in a supporting role as a taxi driver (none of his scenes, however, are shared with Maria.)

In 1982, she offered performances in two comedies, the Italian Looking for Jesus (Cercasi Gesù), with Fernando Rey, and the French Stray Bullets (Balles perdues). Starting from 1984, Schneider began appearing more regularly in European television movies and shows, such as 1985's A Song for Europe (or A Crime of Honour) with a young David Suchet of Agatha Christie's Poirot fame, while doing supporting roles in cinematic turns like the Japanese production of The Princess & the Photographer (1984).

Towards the end of the 1980s, Schneider had substantial roles in the French thriller Résidence surveillée (1987) and the post-apocalyptic surrealistic comedy Bunker Palace Hôtel (1989) with three other legends of French cinema: Jean-Louis Trintignant, Carole Bouquet, and Jean-Pierre Léaud (the latter of which was Schneider's obsessive filmmaker fiancé in Last Tango in Paris.)

Personal life 
In 1974, Schneider came out as bisexual. In early 1976, she abandoned the film set of Caligula (reportedly due to its pornographic content, saying "I am an actress, not a prostitute!") and checked herself into a mental hospital in Rome for several days to be with her lover, photographer Joan Townsend. This, coupled with her refusal to perform nude, led to Schneider's dismissal from the film. The 1970s were turbulent years for Schneider, marked by drug addiction, overdoses, and a suicide attempt. Schneider said that she disliked the instant fame accorded to her from Last Tango in Paris. She suffered abuse and began taking drugs.

Death 
Schneider died of breast cancer on 3 February 2011 at age 58. Her funeral was held on 10 February 2011 at the Church of Saint-Roch, Paris, attended by actors, directors, and producers in French cinema such as Dominique Besnehard, Bertrand Blier, Christine Boisson, Claudia Cardinale, Alain Delon, and Andréa Ferreol, her partner Maria Pia Almadio, half-siblings Fiona and Manuel Gélin, and her uncle Georges Schneider. Delon read a tribute from Brigitte Bardot. Schneider was cremated afterwards at Père Lachaise crematorium, and her ashes were to be scattered at sea at the foot of the Rock of the Virgin in Biarritz, according to her last wishes.

Legacy and honours 
In 2001, Schneider was the guest of honor at the 23rd Festival Créteil Films de Femmes. In a master class at the festival, she called film "a tracing of memory", and said that women must be recognized as actors and directors. She also brought attention to the importance of assisting senior French actors who become unemployed and impoverished. According to Schneider, Marcel Carné, director of Children of Paradise (1945) and one of the most important directors of the late 1930s, would have died in poverty but for La Roue Tourne supporting him for the last 10 years of his life.

On 1 July 2010, Schneider was awarded the medal of Chevalier, Ordre des Arts et des Lettres, for her contributions to the arts by Minister of Culture and Communication, Frédéric Mitterrand. He had acted with her in Jacques Rivette's film, Merry-Go-Round (1981).

After Schneider's death, Patti Smith released a song on her 2012 album Banga called "Maria", which was dedicated both to the actress and nostalgic memories of the 1970s.

In 2018, her cousin Vanessa Schneider published Tu t'appelais Maria Schneider, a book about her.

Filmography

Films

TV series

References

External links 

 
 
 
 Website dedicated to Maria Schneider
 Maria Schneider Filmography

1952 births
2011 deaths
20th-century French actresses
21st-century French actresses
Actresses from Paris
Bisexual actresses
Deaths from breast cancer
Deaths from cancer in France
Chevaliers of the Ordre des Arts et des Lettres
French film actresses
French people of Romanian descent
French television actresses
French LGBT actors